Sarah Monzani (born 1949) is a make-up artist. In 1983, she won an Oscar and a BAFTA for her work in the film Quest for Fire.

References

External links

1949 births
Living people
Best Makeup Academy Award winners
Best Makeup BAFTA Award winners
Make-up artists
Place of birth missing (living people)